Tony Niemistö (born 10 February 1963 in Danderyd, Stockholm County) is a semi-retired Swedish musician, best known as Tony Reno, the original drummer in the rock band Europe He played on Europe's first two albums, Europe and Wings of Tomorrow. He was fired from the band by producer Thomas Erdtman
without informing the band members before the second leg of the Wings of Tomorrow tour in 1984. He was replaced by Ian Haugland.

In 1986 Niemistö joined the heavy metal band Geisha, replacing Mikkey Dee. Niemistö changed his stage name to Tony Lace, but eventually he went back to using his real name. Geisha released the album Phantasmagoria in 1987, before splitting up two years later. Geisha's vocalist Yenz Cheyenne then formed the band =Y=, which Niemistö joined. They released an EP, =Y= in 1991, and an album, Rawchild in 1992.

Niemistö had not participated in anything related to Europe for 29 years. That activity drought ended in 2013, when the group was celebrating the 30th anniversary of the release of their original album. Niemistö autographed 30 copies of a canvas replica of the 1983 album's cover, and then later on took part in a 10-guitar auction (of which the proceeds from 'The Final Countdown' guitar benefitted the efforts of the 'Médecins Sans Frontiers' organization in the Philippines), where he autographed the guitar containing art of the debut album.

Niemistö is currently living in Vallentuna, Sweden, where he works for a computer company.

Discography

Europe
Europe (1983)
Wings of Tomorrow (1984)

Geisha
Phantasmagoria (1987)

=Y=
=Y= (1991)
Rawchild (1992)

References

1963 births
Living people
People from Danderyd Municipality
Europe (band) members
Swedish drummers
Male drummers
Swedish heavy metal drummers